Estádio Barão de Serra Negra  is a multi-use stadium located in Piracicaba, Brazil. It is used mostly for football matches and hosts the home matches of Esporte Clube XV de Novembro. The stadium has a maximum capacity of 18,799 people and was built in 1965. It is owned by the Prefecture of Piracicaba, and is named after the woodland where the stadium was built.

History
It was built in 1965, and inaugurated on September 4 of that year. The inaugural match was played on that day, when XV de Piracicaba and Palmeiras drew 0-0.

On September 19, 1965, the first goal of the stadium was scored by Corinthians' Flávio, when Corinthians beat XV de Piracicaba 3–1.

The stadium's attendance record currently stands at 27,100, set on November 30, 1983, when XV de Piracicaba beat Bandeirante 3–2.

References

 Enciclopédia do Futebol Brasileiro, Volume 2 - Lance, Rio de Janeiro: Aretê Editorial S/A, 2001.
 Templos do Futebol

External links
 Templos do Futebol

Barao de Serra Negra
Sports venues in São Paulo (state)